Uxacona was a Romano-British settlement located at Redhill near present-day Telford, Shropshire.

The settlement lies at the highest point of the Roman Watling Street, approximately 11 Roman miles from Viroconium Cornoviorum (Wroxeter) to the west, and 11 miles from Pennocrucium (Penkridge) to the east. Its only documentary mention is in the 2nd century Antonine Itinerary.

The main settlement consisted of a small enclosure bisected by Watling Street, surrounded by a single ditch  and showing evidence of occupation from the early to the mid 4th century. To the north of the settlement lay a large single-ditched enclosure that may have been a military storage depot from the campaign of Quintus Veranius in AD 57 and a smaller double-ditched enclosure that may have been a signal station from the later 1st century.

References

History of Shropshire
Roman towns and cities in England
Former populated places in Shropshire